"Kad hodaš" (trans. "When You Walk") is a single from Serbian and former Yugoslav rock band Riblja Čorba.

The B-side features the song "Priča o Žiki Živcu" (trans. "The Story of grumpy Žika"). The title song is widely considered to be one of the most popular and powerful ballads of ex-Yugoslav rock music.

Background
The song "Kad hodaš" was written by the band's guitarist Momčilo Bajagić for the band's 1984 album Večeras vas zabavljaju muzičari koji piju.

In 2009, pop/rock singer Marina Perazić claimed that she (at the time singer in the synthpop duo Denis & Denis) and Bajagić had a short-time relationship in the 1980s and that Bajagić dedicated "Kad hodaš" to her. However, Bajagić denied the claim that the song was dedicated to Perazić.

Other versions
After he left Riblja Čorba, Bajagić continued to perform the song with his new band, Bajaga i Instruktori. Bajaga i Instruktori live album Neka svemir čuje nemir features a version of the song.

Legacy
In 2006, "Kad hodaš" was ranked #4 on the B92 Top 100 Yugoslav songs list.

Track listing
"Kad hodaš" - 4:06
"Priča o Žiki Živcu" - 3:00

Personnel
Bora Đorđević - vocals
Miša Aleksić - bass guitar
Rajko Kojić - guitar
Momčilo Bajagić - guitar
Vladimir Golubović - drums

References

 EX YU ROCK enciklopedija 1960-2006,  Janjatović Petar;  
 Riblja čorba,  Jakovljević Mirko;

External links
"Kad hodaš" at Discogs

1984 singles
Riblja Čorba songs
1984 songs